An auxiliary language is one not the primary or native language of a community. It may refer to:

 Interlanguage, an idiolect that has been developed by a learner of a second language
 International auxiliary language, a planned language constructed for international communication, such as Esperanto or International Sign
 Minority language, a secondary language that has official recognition
 Sacred language, also called liturgical language or initiation language, used in religious services

See also
 International Auxiliary Language Association
 Secret language (disambiguation)